The 1914 Fordham Maroon football team was an American football team that represented Fordham University as an independent during the 1914 college football season. Fordham claims an 18–4–1 record. College Football Data Warehouse (CFDW) lists the team's record at 6–3–1. 

Skip Wymard was the head coach, and Charles Wymard was the captain. The team played its home games at Fordham Field in The Bronx.

Schedule
The following 10 games are reported in Fordham's media guide, CFDW and contemporaneous press coverage.

The following are 13 additional games reported in the Fordham media guide.

References

Fordham
Fordham Rams football seasons
Fordham Maroon football